Attie Maposa (born 22 April 1990) is a South African first-class cricketer. He was included in the KZN Inland squad for the 2015 Africa T20 Cup. In September 2018, he was named in KwaZulu-Natal Inland's squad for the 2018 Africa T20 Cup. He was the leading wicket-taker for KwaZulu-Natal Inland in the 2018–19 CSA 3-Day Provincial Cup, with 21 dismissals in nine matches.

References

External links
 

1990 births
Living people
South African cricketers
KwaZulu-Natal Inland cricketers